Barzinjah or Barzinja is a town in Sulaymaniyah Province in Kurdistan Region, Iraq.

Notable people 

 Sultan Sahak

References

Populated places in Sulaymaniyah Province
Kurdish settlements in Iraq